The Eibiswald Formation is a geologic formation in Austria. It preserves fossils dated to the Langhian age of the Miocene epoch.

See also 
 List of fossiliferous stratigraphic units in Austria

References 

Geologic formations of Austria
Miocene Series of Europe
Neogene Austria
Langhian
Coal formations
Coal in Austria
Paludal deposits
Paleontology in Austria